Kevin Manning may refer to:

 Kevin Manning (bishop) (born 1933), Bishop Emeritus of Roman Catholic Diocese of Parramatta, Australia
 Kevin Manning (jockey) (born 1967), Irish jockey
 Kevin J. Manning (born 1944), President of Stevenson University